Barton is a village and civil parish in the Richmondshire district of North Yorkshire, England.  According to the 2011 census it had a population of 837. It is situated near the border with the ceremonial county of County Durham, and is 6 miles south-west of Darlington.

History

The village is recorded as Bartun in the Domesday Book. At the time of the Norman invasion the manor was split between Earl Edwin and Ulf. Afterwards it was granted to Count Alan of Brittany. In turn he granted the manor to Godric, the steward. The manor was split, unified and then split again during the 13th century. At the time of Henry III, the manor was following the descent of Richmond. In 1227, part of the lands were granted to Richard of Cornwall and then to Peter de Brus, lord of Skelton. The manor was further split into mesne lordships, of which Roald of Richmond held one in 1286 and which then followed the descent of the Scropes of Bolton. Other parts of the manor were granted to William de Lancaster around 1235. By 1330 the lands had passed to the Mowbray family. When their direct descent ended in 1391, the manor was passed to the Ingleby's of Ripley. In 1579 this line too ended and the land passed to John Ward whose descendants via marriages included the Dodsworth and Killinghall families until 1762. The second part of the manor was passed to John de Huddleston around 1316. These eventually passed to the descendants of the manors of Barforth and Cleasby. The remaining mesne lordship was held Raplh, son of Ranulph of Richmond in 1268 and passed eventually to the Wandesford family and finally to the Dodsworths

The etymology of the name of the village is derived from the Old English phrase bere-tūn, initially meaning barley farm, but later came to mean a demesne farm or outlying grange.

Governance

The village lies within the Richmond UK Parliament constituency. It also lies within the Richmondshire North electoral division of North Yorkshire County Council and the Barton ward of Richmondshire District Council. An electoral ward in the same name exists. This ward stretches north-east to Cleasby with a total population taken at the 2011 Census of 1,224.

Geography 

The village of Newton Morrell is the closest to Barton at just  to the north-east and Stapleton  northward. Other settlements that are close by include Melsonby  to the west, Middleton Tyas  to the south and Aldbrough St John  to the north-west. Barton Beck flows north through the centre of the village creating a ford across Mary Gate. It joins Clow Beck on the north side of the nearby A1(M) and is part of the tributary system of the River Tees.

Demography

2001 census

The 2001 UK census showed that the population was split 47.8% male to 52.2% female. The religious constituency was made of 83.1% Christian, 0.3% Jewish, 0.6% Muslim and the rest stating no religion or not stating at all. The ethnic make-up was 98.9% White British, 0.5% Mixed ethnic and 0.7% White other. There were 376 dwellings.

2011 census

The 2011 UK census showed that the population was split 48.4% male to 51.6% female. The religious constituency was made of 77.3% Christian, 0.1% Muslim and the rest stating no religion or not stating at all. The ethnic make-up was 98% White British, 0.1% Mixed ethnic, 0.1% British Asian, 0.1% British Black and 1% each White Other. There were 386 dwellings.

Community and culture

Education in the village is provided by Barton CE Primary School. Pupils would then receive secondary education at Richmond School and Sixth Form College. There is a public house and a local village store incorporating a post office. The village is home to Barton Cricket Club who play at the playing fields on Church Lane. They compete in the Darlington and District League.

Religion

There is a Church of England church dedicated to St Cuthbert and St Mary in the village, located on Church Lane. The Grade II listed building dates from 1840 when the two parishes of both the named Saints were brought together due to the ruinous state of both buildings. There is also a Methodist Chapel located in Church Row that was built in 1829 and repaired in 1878.

References

External links
 

Villages in North Yorkshire
Civil parishes in North Yorkshire
Richmondshire